Bel Kyesang Dongtsab (? – 755), also known as Bel Dongtsab, was a general of Tibetan Empire.

Bel Dongtsab invaded Bruzha (mordern Gilgit in Pakistan) in 737 and conquered it. Later, he was appointed as the Lönchen by Me Agtsom.

Bel Dongtsab murdered Me Agtsom in 755, and launched a rebellion together with his colleague Lang Nyesig. They were supported by the Sumpa king Dro Tsen. Dongtsab was defeated by two famous generals, Chimshang Gyalsig Shuteng and Nganlam Takdra Lukhong, and was captured. He was executed together with Lang Nyesig and their family members.

References
Old Tibetan Annals (version I), I.T.J. 0750
Old Tibetan Chronicle, P.T. 1287

8th-century Tibetan people
People of the Tibetan Empire
755 deaths
8th-century executions